Lentithecium is a genus of fungi belonging to the family Lentitheciaceae.

The species of this genus are found in Europe.

Species:

Lentithecium aquaticum 
Lentithecium cangshanense 
Lentithecium carbonneanum 
Lentithecium clioninum 
Lentithecium fluviatile 
Lentithecium lineare 
Lentithecium pseudoclioninum 
Lentithecium rarum 
Lentithecium unicellulare 
Lentithecium voraginesporum

References

Pleosporales
Dothideomycetes genera